The 54th District of the Iowa House of Representatives in the state of Iowa.

Current elected officials
Shannon Latham is the representative currently representing the district.

Past representatives
The district has previously been represented by:
 Laverne Schroeder, 1971–1973
 Arlyn E. Danker, 1973–1983
 Richard J. Varn, 1983–1987
 Robert Dvorsky, 1987–1993
 Richard Running, 1993–1995
 Todd Taylor, 1995–2003
 Christopher Rants, 2003–2011
 Ron Jorgensen, 2011–2013
 Linda Upmeyer, 2013–2021
 Shannon Latham, 2021–present

References

054